Of Old Hearts and Swords is a 2007  novel by Georgian writer Aka Morchiladze. In 2013 it was published in Sweden and in 2015 in England.

Translations
The novel has been translated into several languages, including English as Of Old Hearts and Swords and Swedish as Spegelriket.

References

External links
 Novel in Goodreads.com

2007 novels
20th-century Georgian novels
Novels by Aka Morchiladze
Historical novels
Dalkey Archive Press books